Kosmos 662 ( meaning Cosmos 662), also known as DS-P1-I No.14 was a satellite which was used as a radar target for anti-ballistic missile tests. It was launched by the Soviet Union in 1974 as part of the Dnepropetrovsk Sputnik programme.

It was launched aboard a Kosmos-2I 63SM rocket, from Site 133/1 at Plesetsk. The launch occurred at 12:30 UTC on 26 June 1974.

It decayed from orbit on 28 August 1976.

Kosmos 662 was the fourteenth of nineteen DS-P1-I satellites to be launched. Of these, all reached orbit successfully except the seventh.

See also

1974 in spaceflight

References

1974 in spaceflight
Kosmos satellites
Spacecraft launched in 1974
Dnepropetrovsk Sputnik program